The 2023 Derbyshire Dales District Council election will be held on 4 May 2023 to elect all 34 councillors for Derbyshire Dales District Council. This will be on the same day as other local elections.

In the last election, the Conservative Party retained control of the council for the fifth consecutive election, with a significantly reduced majority of 1.

This will be the first election to the Derbyshire Dales District Council to be held under the new ward boundaries. The total number of councillors is reduced from 39 to 34, and the total number of wards is reduced from 25 to 21. Consequently, the boundaries of most of the wards are different compared to those which have been in use since the 2003 election. The new boundaries under which this election will take place can be viewed here and the arrangements for each new ward are described below.

Ward results

Ashbourne North
Ashbourne North is still represented by two councillors and is slightly expanded.

Ashbourne South
Ashbourne South is now represented by three councillors instead of two and is expanded.

Bakewell
Bakewell is now represented by two councillors instead of three but remains geographically the same.

Bonsall and Winster
Bonsall and Winster is a new ward which is to be represented by one councillor. It is not broadly conterminous with any previous ward but mostly contains parishes that were previously part of the ward of Masson.

Bradwell
Bradwell is still represented by one councillor and is slightly expanded.

Brailsford
Brailsford is still represented by one councillor and is geographically the same.

Calver and Longstone
Calver and Longstone is a new ward which is to be represented by one councillor. Is is predominantly formed of parishes from the old wards of Calver, and Litton and Longstone.

Chatsworth
Chatsworth is still represented by one councillor and is slightly expanded.

Cromford and Matlock Bath
Cromford and Matlock Bath is a new ward which is to be represented by one councillor. Is is predominantly formed of parishes from the old ward of Masson.

Darley Dale
Darley Dale is still represented by three councillors and is slightly expanded.

Dovedale, Parwich and Brassington
Dovedale, Parwich and Brassington is a new ward which is to be represented by one councillor. It is broadly conterminous with the old ward of Dovedale and Parwich, which was also represented by one councillor.

Doveridge and Sudbury
Doveridge and Sudbury is still represented by one councillor and is geographically the same.

Hartington and Taddington
Hartington and Taddington is still represented by one councillor and is slightly expanded.

Hathersage
Hathersage is a new ward which is to be represented by two councillors. It is broadly conterminous with the old ward of Hathersage and Eyam, which was also represented by two councillors.

Hulland
Hulland is still represented by one councillor and is slightly redrawn.

Matlock East and Tansley
Matlock East and Tansley is a new ward which is to be represented by three councillors. It is broadly conterminous with the old ward of Matlock St. Giles, which was also represented by three councillors.

Matlock West
Matlock West is a new ward which is to be represented by three councillors. It is broadly conterminous with the old ward of Matlock All Saints, which was also represented by three councillors.

Norbury
Norbury is still represented by one councillor and is slightly expanded.

Tideswell
Tideswell is still represented by one councillor and is slightly expanded.

Wirksworth
Wirksworth is still represented by three councillors and is slightly expanded.

Youlgrave
Youlgrave is a new ward which is to be represented by one councillor. It is broadly conterminous with the old ward of Lathkill and Bradford, which was also represented by one councillor.

References 

2023 English local elections
Derbyshire Dales District Council elections
May 2023 events in the United Kingdom
2020s in Derbyshire